The sifung (or sufin) is a traditional musical instrument of the Bodo people of Assam. It is a kind of bamboo flute, but  much longer than is common. Sifung has five holes in contrast to the north Indian bansuri which has six holes.

References

Bodo
Side-blown flutes
Indian musical instruments